Bellavista Airport  is an airstrip serving the town of Jeberos in the Loreto Region of Peru.

See also

Transport in Peru
List of airports in Peru

References

External links
OpenStreetMap - Jeberos
OurAirports - Jeberos
SkyVector - Jeberos
Bellavista Airport

Airports in Peru
Buildings and structures in Loreto Region